Eka Purnama Indah (born 27 May 1983) is an Indonesian diver. She competed in the women's 3 metre springboard event at the 2000 Summer Olympics.

References

External links
 

1983 births
Living people
Indonesian female divers
Olympic divers of Indonesia
Divers at the 2000 Summer Olympics
Place of birth missing (living people)
Divers at the 2018 Asian Games
Asian Games competitors for Indonesia
20th-century Indonesian women
21st-century Indonesian women